7eventh Time Down (pronounced "Seventh Time Down") is an American Christian rock band.

Background 
The band is from Mount Vernon, Kentucky. They have released five full-length albums and two Christmas EPs. Their biggest radio single is "God Is on the Move" which stayed at No. 1 for five weeks and was the #5 song of 2016. Their single Just Say Jesus remained on the charts for 52 consecutive weeks and was the #16 song of 2014. Their new album was released in 2022.

Reception 
Mariah Secrest said "it only takes about two seconds to like the band members from 7eventh Time Down. These Kentucky boys will welcome you at once with their good-natured banter and laid-back persona. But don't let them fool you. On stage, they mean business." They are "Straight up rock 'n rollers, they blend classic rock tactics to make their sound aggressive with enough melodic hooks to lodge their choruses into the mind long after the show is over. They pull from the best of timeless bands such as Led Zeppelin, The Who, The Doors, AC/DC and even Johnny Cash, infusing a raucous yet crafted musical landscape with lyrics that shoot straight-from-the-hip."

Philanthropy 
The Band supports CURE International, a nonprofit organization that assists kids who have physical disabilities.

Discography

Albums

EPs 
 A Christmas Wish List – (2014) BEC Recordings

Singles

Other charted songs

References

External links 
 
 An Interview with 7eventh Time Down from Karis Magazine

BEC Recordings artists
Christian rock groups from Kentucky
Musical groups established in 2004
2004 establishments in Kentucky
People from Rockcastle County, Kentucky